Harrisville is a borough in Butler County, Pennsylvania, United States. The population was 897 at the 2010 census.

History
The Seneca people used the Harrisville area for growing corn due to its fertile soil and flat growing area.

Col. Robert Reed built a tavern and a distillery just south of present-day Harrisville in 1797. This was the first tavern between Pittsburgh and Franklin, Pennsylvania.

Harrisville was founded in 1826 by Ephraim Harris. Harrisville was incorporated in 1846 by joining Harrisville and Reedsville. Harrisville had its first school in 1830, and in 1856 a high school was built.

Geography
Harrisville is located near the northwestern border of Butler County at  (41.134966, -80.009590). Pennsylvania Routes 8 and 58 intersect in the center of the borough. Route 8 leads south  to Butler, the county seat, and north  to Franklin on the Allegheny River, while Route 58 leads east  to Foxburg on the Allegheny River and west  to Grove City.  Harrisville is drained by McMurray Run, a tributary of Slippery Rock Creek.

Demographics

As of the census of 2000, there were 883 people, 323 households, and 231 families residing in the borough. The population density was 1,079.5 people per square mile (415.8/km2). There were 346 housing units at an average density of 423.0 per square mile (162.9/km2). The racial makeup of the borough was 98.19% White, 0.57% African American, 0.11% Native American, 0.11% Asian, 0.79% from other races, and 0.23% from two or more races. Hispanic or Latino of any race were 0.11% of the population.

There were 323 households, in 28.8% of which children under the age of 18 lived; 60.4% consisted of married couples living together; 8.4% had a female householder with no husband present; and 28.2% were non-family households. 24.5% of all households were made up of individuals, and 9.3% had someone living alone who was 65 years of age or older. The average household size was 2.45 and the average family size was 2.92.

In the borough the population was spread out, with 20.5% under the age of 18, 6.9% from 18 to 24, 24.7% from 25 to 44, 24.1% from 45 to 64, and 23.8% who were 65 years of age or older. The median age was 43 years. For every 100 females there were 95.8 males. For every 100 females age 18 and over, there were 92.9 males.

The median income for a household in the borough was $31,964, and the median income for a family was $35,455. Males had a median income of $29,167 versus $17,500 for females. The per capita income for the borough was $12,683. About 8.8% of families and 13.4% of the population were below the poverty line, including 21.6% of those under age 18 and 13.6% of those age 65 or over.

Notable person
 Ella Hamilton Durley (ca. 1852 – 1922), educator, newspaper editor, and journalist

References

Populated places established in 1826
Boroughs in Butler County, Pennsylvania
1826 establishments in Pennsylvania